My Hits and Love Songs is the fifty-seventh album by American singer/guitarist Glen Campbell, released in 1999 (see 1999 in music). It consists of a compilation disc My Hits and a new studio album Love Songs.

Track listing
Sourced from AllMusic and the CD album booklet.

Disc 1: My Hits  
 
 "Your Cheatin' Heart" (Hank Williams) – 3:17 
 "Wichita Lineman" (Jimmy Webb) – 3:06
 "By The Time I Get to Phoenix" (Jimmy Webb) – 2:42
 "Galveston" (Jimmy Webb) – 2:39
 "Where's the Playground Suzie" (Jimmy Webb) – 2:55
 "Gentle on My Mind" (John Hartford) – 2:56
 "Let It Be Me" (Gilbert Bécaud, Mann Curtis) with Bobbie Gentry – 2:04
 "Honey Come Back" (Jimmy Webb) – 3:02
 "The Last Thing on My Mind" (Paxton) – 3:54
 "Dreams of the Everyday Housewife" (Gantry) – 2:34
 "Both Sides Now" (Joni Mitchell) – 3:44
 "Reason to Believe" (Tim Hardin) – 2:15
 "Try a Little Kindness" (Austin, Sapaugh) – 2:24
 "All I Have To Do Is Dream" (Boudleaux Bryant) with Bobbie Gentry – 2:33
 "It's Only Make Believe" (Conway Twitty, Jack Nance) – 2:26
 "Country Boy (You Got Your Feet in LA)" (Lambert, Brian Potter) – 3:05
 "Southern Nights" (Allen Toussaint) – 3:07
 "Rhinestone Cowboy" (Larry Weiss) – 3:08
 
Disc 2: Love Songs
 
 "(What a) Wonderful World" (Sam Cooke, Lou Adler, Herb Alpert) – 2:16
 "Feelings" (Albert, Kaiserman, Gate) – 3:42
 "Without You" (Pete Ham, Tom Evans) – 3:06
 "Make It Easy on Yourself" (Burt Bacharach, Hal David) – 3:04
 "I Believe" (Drake, Graham, Shirl, Stillman) – 2:06
 "Bridge Over Troubled Water" (Paul Simon) – 4:38
 "Ebb Tide" (Sigmon, Maxwell) – 2:21
 "It's All in the Game" (Dawes, Sigman) – 2:34
 "Since I Fell for You" (Buddy Johnson) – 2:41
 "You've Lost That Lovin' Feeling" (Phil Spector, Barry Mann, Cynthia Weil) – 4:21
 "You Don't Have To Say You Love Me" (Vicki Wickham, Simon Napier-Bell, Pino Donaggio, Vito Pallavicini) – 2:37
 "Time in a Bottle" (Jim Croce) – 2:19
 "Let It Be Me" (Gilbert Bécaud, Mann Curtis) with Debby Campbell – 2:00
 "The Impossible Dream" (Joe Darion, Mitch Leigh) – 2:39
 "And I Love You So" (Don McLean) – 3:13
 "The Rest of the Road" (Thurman, Brasher) – 3:33
 "Only Love Can Break a Heart" (Burt Bacharach, Hal David) – 3:20
 "You'll Never Walk Alone" (Oscar Hammerstein II, Richard Rodgers) – 2:45

Personnel
Sourced from the CD album booklet.
Glen Campbell – vocals
Debby Campbell – vocals

Production
Sourced from the CD album booklet.
Producer – Jack Jackson/Jack Jackson Music Group, Nashville, TN
Recorder engineer – Bob Kruson
Remixed by Nick Smith/Hatch Farm Studios, Surrey, England
Photography – Jeff Ross
Design – The Red Room
Manufactured by EMI under exclusive licence from TKO Licensing Limited as exclusive agent for the Kruger Organization, Inc.
My Hits – copyright owned by Capitol Records
Love Songs – copyright owned by TKO Licensing, LTD

References

Glen Campbell albums
EMI Records albums
1999 albums